Romel is a given name. Notable people with the name include:

Romel Andrews (born 1963), American player of gridiron football
Romel Beck (born 1982), Mexican basketball player
Romel Currency (born 1982), West Indian cricketer
Romel Raffin (born 1954), Canadian basketball player
Romel Quiñónez (born 1992), Bolivian footballer